Hospital Central ("Central Hospital"; previously Línea Roja) is a Spanish television series that follows the professional and personal lives of the staff of the fictitious Hospital Central in Madrid. New episodes are shown by Telecinco network in Spain, and cable/satellite channel Factoría de Ficción reruns them a couple of weeks later. Another cable/satellite channel, AXN, reruns the old episodes.

Produced by Videomedia, the series started in April 2000 and finished in December 2012 after its 20th season. It is often said to be a Spanish version of ER.

Cast

Final cast

Departed cast

Recurring cast
Lucas (Arturo Arribas), SAMUR doctor.
Fernando (Alberto Mateo), SAMUR doctor.
Edgar (Amaruk Kayshapanta, season 15, episode 206 – 209 – 215)
Susana (Tamara Arias, seasons 13–15), Hector's girlfriend.
Alejandro Vilches (Kirian Sánchez, seasons 1–14), Dr. Vilches teenaged son. Years ago, he suffered a grave depression after his best friend died, and tried to kill himself by jumping out his window. He is anorexic.
Dr. Bernardo Ferreira (Miguel Nieto, seasons 1–3, special appearance in season 4), hospital director. He left after suffering a heart attack.
Dr. Miguel Seró (Ricard Rodriguez, seasons 2–4), a married pediatrician who had an affair with Andrea but ultimately returned to his wife and daughter.
Nurse Marcelina "Queca" Martínez (Pepa Roldán, seasons 3–11), an ER nurse who later married Rusti. She left the job to be a stay at home mom.
Dr. Manolo Hervás (Ferrán Rañé, season 3), a senior psychiatrist who sexually harassed Cristina and left the hospital when Santiago confronted him.
Gonzalo (Juli Fàbregas, season 3), the leader of a dangerous sect disguised as a social worker, he managed to suck Diana in and killed Mario after he stopped his sect's mass suicide ritual. He finally killed himself.
Mª Angeles Cabrera (Sílvia Sabaté, seasons 4–11), Dr. Aimé's ex-wife and mother of his daughter. She was an alcoholic who got into an abusive relationship. Aimé had to rescue her, and they grew closer again. She recently died in a car crash.
Nacho Crespo (Aure Sánchez, seasons 4–6), Fran's brother. A graphic designer and illustrator who also was an ex-drug addict with a form of epilepsy. He fell in love with Eva and started dating her, until he found out she was cheating on him with his own brother Fran.
Germán Prada (Fernando Guillén, seasons 4–6), the hospital administrator. He had no qualms in doing what necessary to keep the status quo, and was Santiago's fiercest opponent.
Nurse Miriam Canalda (Leticia Dolera, season 7), an ER nurse and Dr. Davila's niece. She was a cocaine addict who finally agreed to rehabilitate.
Candela (Clara Lago, seasons 7–9), Cruz's teenaged daughter. She stayed with her mother after her parents divorced. She's currently studying abroad.
Daniel "D.J." Alonso (Eloy Azorín, season 8), a medicine student who had a drunken one-night with Cruz and fell in love with her, but she refused his advances. He finally left medicine to follow his dream to become a disc-jockey in Ibiza.
Gabriela Dávila (Marta Solaz, seasons 8–12), Dr. Davila's daughter who got diagnosed with cancer, but survived. During the treatment, she started a relationship with Héctor.
Belén (Eva Marciel, season 8–12), Javier's wife. She was very much in love with him and didn't take well his leaving her. She's doing everything in her hand to prevent him from seeing their son, including moving to another town and claiming it wasn't really his son.
Ágata Monasterio (Laura Pamplona, season 12), a high-ranking employee from the Ministry of Health who kept interfering in everything to make the hospital more cost-efficient. She took the job of hospital administrator, and fired Dávila among other things. She also tried to seduce Vilches, but failed.
Tomás Carrero (Rafa Reaño, seasons 12–13), a police inspector. He's had an on-and-off relationship with Mónica for some time.
Marina Lara (Lara Corrochano, season 12), Raúl's sister. She was an alcoholic in the midst of a divorce, when she disappeared. It was later found out that her husband had accidentally killed her in a discussion.

Special guest stars
During these eight years, Hospital Central also got some well-known actors and artists in Spain to do take on guest starring roles. Some of them were:
Pilar López de Ayala
José Sacristán
Pilar Bardem
Agustín González
José Luis López Vázquez
Lolita Flores (4-episode story arc)
Jorge Sanz
Chenoa as herself
David Bisbal as himself
Julieta Venegas as herself (with musical show included)
Sancho Gracia as himself
Lucía Caraballo as Nadia and as Nuria

Episodes

Season 1

Season 2

Season 3

Season 4

Season 5

Season 6

Season 7

Season 8

Season 9

Season 10

Season 11

Season 12

Season 13

Season 14

Season 15

Season 16

Season 17

References

External links
Official website 
 All episodes in Mitele.es

Television shows set in Madrid
2000 Spanish television series debuts
2012 Spanish television series endings
Telecinco network series
Spanish LGBT-related television shows
2000s medical television series
2010s medical television series
2000s Spanish drama television series
2010s Spanish drama television series
Spanish medical television series